The Georgium is a princely palace in Dessau, Germany. It was built for Johann Georg von Anhalt-Dessau, younger brother of Leopold III, Duke of Anhalt-Dessau. It now houses the Anhaltische Gemäldegalerie art gallery.

External links

Data

Palaces in Saxony-Anhalt